Rollerblade is a brand of inline skates owned by Nordica, part of the Tecnica Group of Giavera del Montello, Treviso, Italy.

The company was started by Scott Olson (b. 1960), Brennan Olson (b. 1964) and Christopher Middlebrook in Minneapolis as Ole's Innovative Sports; when they sold the company, it became Rollerblade, Inc. and has changed hands over time between Nordica, Benetton Group and Tecnica.

Inline-skates had been used for many years by ice speed skaters before they became mainstream. For the first few years after Rollerblade was developed, Rollerblade, Inc. were the only manufacturer of in-line skates that had worldwide distribution. This allowed the company to capitalize and grab a huge percentage of the world market share and almost total dominance of the North American market with aggressive advertising campaigns and sponsored in-line-only sporting events.

Rollerblade, Inc. manufactures different types of skates, such as those for aggressive skating, fitness, or recreational use with removable "walkable" liners, as well as adjustable skates for younger users.

References

External links
Rollerblade official web site

Brands that became generic
Roller skates
Tecnica Group
American inventions
Products introduced in 1982